The Royal Society of the Humanities at Uppsala is a Swedish Royal academy for the study of the humanities.

Founding
The society was founded in 1889 by a donation from tannery factory owner Jacob Westin in Stockholm who gave SEK 50,000 in his will dated 1878 to form a scientific community to further the study of philosophy, philology and history sciences. Westin also donated a large collection of books and manuscripts to Uppsala University library.

The society's statutes were ratified by the Swedish king on 28 March 1896.

Prizes
The society annually awards a prize to two doctoral dissertations, known as the Westinska prize.

References 

Humanities
Humanities institutes
Scandinavian studies
Uppsala University
1889 establishments in Sweden
Organizations established in 1889